Bebop Moptop is the second album by Scottish pop group Danny Wilson.

Track listing 
All tracks composed by Gary Clark; except where indicated.
 "Imaginary Girl"
 "The Second Summer of Love"
 "I Can't Wait" (Ged Grimes, Kit Clark)
 "If You Really Love Me (Let Me Go)"
 "If Everything You Said Was True"
 "Loneliness"
 "I Was Wrong"
 "Charlie Boy"
 "Never Gonna Be the Same"
 "Desert Hearts" (Gary Clark, Ali Thomson)
 "N.Y.C. Shanty" (Kit Clark)
 "Goodbye Shanty Town"
 "The Ballad of Me and Shirley Maclaine"

Personnel
Gary Clark
Ged Grimes
Kit Clark
Christopher Marra - rhythm guitar, pedal steel, harmonica, tuba
Brian McDermott, David Palmer - drums
Frank Rossiter, Gary Thomson - horns on "The Ballad of Me and Shirley Maclaine"
Ali Thomson - background vocals on "Desert Hearts"

References 

1989 albums
Danny Wilson (band) albums
Virgin Records albums